Mockingbird is a science fiction novel by American writer Walter Tevis, first published in 1980. It was nominated for a Nebula Award for Best Novel.

Plot
The novel opens with Spofforth, the android Dean of New York University, attempting suicide; he has lived for centuries yet yearns to die. 
Spofforth brings a teacher, Paul Bentley, to New York. Bentley has taught himself to read after a Rosetta Stone–like discovery of a film with words matching those in a children's primer.
Spofforth begins to dislike Bentley and the knowledge he has from reading. Bentley says he could teach others to read, but Spofforth instead gives him a job of decoding the written titles in ancient silent films. 
At a zoo, Bentley meets Mary Lou. He explains the concept of reading to her, and the two embark on a path toward literacy.  Spofforth responds by sending Bentley to prison for the crime of reading and takes Mary Lou as an unwilling housemate.  The novel then follows Bentley's journey of discovery after his escape from prison, culminating in his eventual reunion with Mary Lou and their assistance with Spofforth's suicide.

Reviews
Anne McCaffrey commented, "I've read other novels extrapolating the dangers of computerization, but Mockingbird stings me, the writer, the hardest. The notion, the possibility, that people might indeed lose the ability, and worse, the desire to read, is made acutely probable."

When a new edition was published in 1999, with an introduction by Jonathan Lethem, Pat Holt stated that, "The book often feels like a combination 1984 and Brave New World, with a dash of the movie Escape from New York thrown in."

Reviewing the 1999 edition, James Sallis declared that "Mockingbird collapses the whole of mankind's perverse, self-destructive, indomitable history, cruelty and kindness alike, into its black-humor narrative of a robot's death wish."

Film adaptation
On April 20, 2022, it was announced that Alma Har'el will direct a film adaptation of the book for Searchlight Pictures.

References

External links
Don Swaim interviews Walter Tevis (1983-84)

1980 American novels
Science fiction novels by Walter Tevis
1980 science fiction novels
American science fiction novels
Novels set in New York City
Doubleday (publisher) books